Justice Pigott may refer to:

Eugene F. Pigott Jr. (born 1946), judge of the New York Court of Appeals
William Trigg Pigott (1860–1944), associate justice of the Montana Supreme Court